The first season of One Million Star, a Taiwanese televised singing competition, began on January 5, 2007.

Episodes

Ranking
The ranking and score of each episodes.

 The winning contestant.
 The contestants who scored higher than 20.
 The contestant who failed.
 The contestant who was eliminated.

The six finalists

 The contestant with the highest score.
 The contestant with the full score.

Million Star Gang
Members of Million Star Gang (星光幫)

 James Lin (林宥嘉)
 Judy Chou (周定緯)
 Peter Pan (潘裕文)
 Afalean Lu (盧學叡)
 Miles Liu (劉明峰)
 Stanly Xu (許仁杰)
 Kevin Xie (謝震廷)
 Sharon Li (李宣榕)
 Charks An (安伯政)
 Ring Hsu (徐宛鈴)
Aska Yang (楊宗緯)

Discography

References

External links
  The First Season

Taiwanese television series